The Ziwei Bridge is a historic stone arch bridge over the Cangji River in , Haining, Zhejiang, China.

History
The temple was originally built in 1303 during emperor Temür Khan's reign during the Yuan dynasty (1271–1368), and underwent three renovations, respectively in 1730 and 1796 of the Qing dynasty (1644–1911) and in 2002. The banknote issued by the Farmers Bank of China in the Republic of China used it as the front design. In October 1984, it has been designated as a municipal-level cultural heritage site by the Government of Haining.

Neighbouring area
Huili Temple

References

Bridges in Zhejiang
Arch bridges in China
Bridges completed in 2002
Qing dynasty architecture
Buildings and structures completed in 2002
2002 establishments in China